Moris is a town and seat of Moris Municipality, in the northern Mexican state of Chihuahua. As of 2010, the town of Moris had a population of 1,799, up from 1,158 as of 2005.

Climate

Moris has a Mediterranean climate (Köppen Csa), with hot summers and mild winters, often presenting freezing temperatures.

<div style="width:75%;">

References

Populated places in Chihuahua (state)